Richard Cecil may refer to:
Richard Cecil (priest) (1748–1810), Anglican clergyman
Richard Cecil (courtier) (died 1552), English courtier and father of William Cecil, 1st Baron Burghley
Richard Cecil (poet) (born 1944), American poet
Lord Richard Cecil (1948–1978), British soldier and journalist 
Richard Cecil (died 1633) (1570–1633), English politician